The European Parliament election of 2004 took place on 12–13 June 2004.

The Olive Tree was the most voted list in Sicily with 28.6%, followed by Forza Italia (21.5%), National Alliance (14.5%) and the Union of Christian and Centre Democrats (14.0%). Raffaele Lombardo, who was elected to the European Parliament for the Christian Democrats, left that party in 2005 to launch the Movement for Autonomy, which would have become a stable political force in the region.

Results
Source: Ministry of the Interior

2004 elections in Italy
Elections in Sicily
European Parliament elections in Italy
2004 European Parliament election
June 2004 events in Europe